Eternal Blue may refer to:
Eternal Blue, a 2021 album by Spiritbox
EternalBlue, a National Security Agency (USA) cyberattack exploit
Lunar: Eternal Blue, a role-playing video game by Game Arts and Studio Alex